Cyphia bulbosa, also known by its common name Bulb Baroe, is a species of flowering plant from the genus Cyphia.

References

Campanulaceae